Ronald Raaymakers (born 7 April 1990) is a Rugby union footballer. He plays as either a lock or flank. He represents Counties Manukau in the ITM Cup. He was a member of the  Wider Training Group during 2012 and will play for the Blues in Super Rugby from 2013.

Notes

External links
 itsrugby.co.uk profile

1990 births
Living people
New Zealand rugby union players
Rugby union flankers
Blues (Super Rugby) players
Counties Manukau rugby union players
Rugby union players from the Auckland Region